"In Love with an Angel" was the third and most famous single released by Maria Arredondo. It was released on February 24, 2003, and came in at number one on the Norwegian Top 20 Singles in its second week.

Track listing
Norwegian CD Single
"In Love with an Angel" feat. Christian Ingebrigtsen - 04:31
"For a Friend" - 04:05

Charts

References

2003 singles
Maria Arredondo songs
Number-one singles in Norway
2003 songs
Songs written by Christian Ingebrigtsen